Chư Mom Ray National Park is a national park of Vietnam in the province of Kon Tum, Central Highlands region.

The national park was established according to the Decision number 103/2002/QĐ-TTg dated 30 July 2002 signed by the government of Vietnam. This decision turned the Nature Reserve into National Park.

National parks of Vietnam
Protected areas established in 2002
2002 establishments in Vietnam
Geography of Kon Tum province
ASEAN heritage parks